Spy Muppets: License to Croak is an action video game, part of The Muppets franchise and released in 2003 made for Microsoft Windows and Game Boy Advance by Vicarious Visions and published by TDK Mediactive. It is a spoof of the James Bond films, the title being a reference to Licence to Kill. The player controls Kermit the Frog through several stages in order to stop the bad guys.

Plot
Kermit the Frog works as Agent Frog (who is based on James Bond) for Agent Patriot (who is based on M and played by Sam Eagle) of M.U.P.P.E.T. Agent Patriot debriefs Agent Frog to defeat three villains l.

After beating a villain, Agent Frog brings one of the villain's gadgets to agents B and B (played by Bunsen Honeydew and Beaker respectively) upon completion.

Piggy Galore
Piggy Galore (a parody of Pussy Galore and played by Miss Piggy) used to be one of M.U.P.P.E.T's best and expensive agents before she went bad. M.U.P.P.E.T has spotted some of Piggy Galore's pig henchmen. After B and B prepare Agent Frog's spy car, Agent Frog heads out with Agent Argh (played by Animal) assigned to back-up duty. Agent Frog and Agent Argh follow the pig henchmen to Piggy Galore's hideout in an abandoned warehouse. Agent Frog then has to throw food from the conveyor belt at the pig henchmen to keep them from grabbing him. Agent Frog then confronts Piggy Galore where they end up in a food fight.

If the level is lost, Agent Frog gets locked away and Agent Argh must break down a door to rescue him.

When Piggy Galore is defeated, Agent Frog confiscates the food-flinging device and hands it to B and B while Piggy Galore is locked up at M.U.P.P.E.T.'s jail.

Dr. Nose
Dr. Nose (a parody of Dr. No and played by Gonzo) has a plan to turn the Earth into a giant egg that was at one point foiled by M.U.P.P.E.T. and is trying it again. Agent Patriot dispatches Agent Frog to stop it, with Agent FFF (played by Fozzie Bear) assigned to back-up duty. Dr. Nose's chicken henchmen are preparing to leave by snowmobile, and Agents B and B say they cannot help, as they are too busy with an unknown project, and Agent Frog must get the snowmobile ready himself. Agent Frog is suspicious, but he doesn't have time to worry about it. He and FFF follow the chickens to Dr. Nose's lair, and Agent Frog must subdue the chickens standing guard outside with snowballs. He enters the lair, and discovers Dr. Nose has his machine set up and is ready to execute his plan, and must break the machine by turning all its lights to red.

If the level is lost, Agent Frog is handed to the Swedish Chef to be cooked into a frog omelet. Agent FFF stumbles upon the control room and must divert the eggs from the frying pan and into the Swedish Chef's face.

When Dr. Nose is defeated, Agent Frog takes the intact part of Dr. Nose's invention and hands it to B and B while Dr. Nose is locked up at M.U.P.P.E.T.'s jail.

King Prawn
Agent Patriot tells Agent Frog that M.U.P.P.E.T. suspects that the organization S.H.E.L.L. (Secret Hidden Evil League of Lobsters) led by King Prawn (played by Pepe the King Prawn) is mixed up in the plot since they are acting fishy, and says there are some S.H.E.L.L lobsters leaving the headquarters, which Agent Frog must follow to the S.H.E.L.L. headquarters. Frog goes to Agents B and B to get his boat set up for pursuit, but they say they are too busy, and he must do it. Agent Frog follows the lobsters in his boat after setting it up, with Agent Rat of S.E.W.E.R. (played by Rizzo the Rat) assigned to back-up duty. When he arrives at S.H.E.L.L. and must get through a tunnel of mechanical claws to battle King Prawn. Frog finds his way to King Prawn, and must defeat him by sending electrical charges through the mechanical claws.

If the level is lost, Agent Rat must save Agent Frog from being devoured by shellfish by navigating a maze to chew the wires supplying power to the fish tank.

When King Prawn is defeated, Agent Frog takes King Prawn's mechanical claws to B and B (who say they can find a use for it) while King Prawn is locked up at M.U.P.P.E.T.'s jail.

Statler and Waldorf
As B and B work on studying the inventions, Agent Patriot states to Agent Frog that they might know who the master villain is. It is revealed that B and B are really Statler and Waldorf in disguise while the real B and B are bound and gagged behind a door. Statler and Waldorf have assembled the enemy gadgets to build a giant robot so they can take over the world because they “can't stand watching another minute of this”. Now it is up to Agent Frog to defeat them and save the day even after they have ripped Piggy Galore out of her jail cell.

When Statler and Waldorf are defeated, Piggy Galore regains consciousness where she has lost the memories of having gone bad. Agent Frog and Piggy Galore then take the spy boat out for old times' sake.

Gameplay
There are 15 stages to complete in all. The first involves going to the High Tech Global See-All-Kinds-Of-Stuff Tracking Room to decide which villain to pursue.

External links
 Muppet Central review
 Spy Muppets: License to Croak at Muppet Wiki

2003 video games
Action video games
Spy video games
James Bond parodies
The Muppets video games
Windows games
Game Boy Advance games
Video games about amphibians
Video games developed in the United States
Single-player video games
TDK Mediactive games
Vicarious Visions games